Olga Anatolyevna Zhekulina (4 October 1900 — 5 August 1973) was a noted Russian painter and one of the famous Soviet puppeteers.

She was a member of the Moscow Union of Artists.

Biography
Olga Zhekulina was born in 1900 in a noble family. Originally she received art education in the private studio of the famous Russian artist Konstantin Yuon, where she studied until 1917.

In 1918–1921, she studied at the Free Art Studios of Konstantin Korovin (since 1921 - Vkhutemas). In 1921, she was expelled from Zhekulina Art Workshops for her non-proletarian origin.

Serious creative activity of the artist began at the turn of the 1910s and 20s.

In the 20s Zhekulina participated in the life of the "Fire-color" Association, which also consisted of Arkhipov, Bogorodskiy, Dobuzhinsky, Petrov-Vodkin, Voloshin, and other major artists of the time. The main motives of the artist in painting during this period were - "hut buried in the snow, spring, silver gave summer".

In 1930, she became known for the scenery of "A trivial comedy for serious people" by Oscar Wilde for a branch of the Maly Theater.

After that, she worked for nearly twenty years as the puppet theater artist of the Moscow House of Pioneers.

In the 1950s, She became a member of the Moscow Union of Artists. In the late 1950s Zhekulina working on a major state order: a series of landscapes of the Red Presnya.

In the 1960s, the artist was working on a "Valdai cycle", dedicated to the Russian village.

The artist died in 1973. During her life, the artist created some 200 works.

Family
Her father was a district agronomist, and then a banker. He was repressed.

The older brother Sergey was a professor of psychology. The younger brother Leo was a famous scientist and engineer, author of hundreds of scientific papers. Leo worked with Sergei Korolev.

Works

Further reading
 Т. Клюева. Ольга Анатольевна Жекулина, 1900-1973. Советский художник, 1977
 В.Г.Азаркович. Выставки советского изобразительного искусства: 1954-1958 гг. Сов. художник, 1981
 В.Д.Соловьëв. Русские художники XVIII-ХХ веков. Эксперт-Клуб, 2005
 Ольга Жекулина (1900-1970) / Антикварное обозрение, №1. Спб.: 2007

References

Russian landscape painters
20th-century Russian painters
Russian women artists
Soviet painters
1900 births
1973 deaths
Soviet women artists
20th-century Russian women